Mahat Raghavendra is an Indian actor who works across  Tamil, Telugu and Hindi cinema. He is best known for his supporting roles in the heist thriller film, Mankatha (2011), the action drama, Jilla (2014) and As lead in the Double XL (2022)

Career
After finishing a degree at Hindustan College of Arts and Science, Raghavendra pursued a career in films. Prior to his first full-fledged acting role, Raghavendra was seen as a background artiste in Vallavan (2006) and Kaalai (2008), two films starring his childhood friend, Silambarasan. He was initially set to make his debut in a Tamil remake of the successful Telugu film, Ullasamga Utsahamga (2008). But unfortunately the venture was dropped. Raghavendra was signed to portray a role in Venkat Prabhu's action thriller Mankatha (2011) which featured an ensemble cast including Ajith Kumar, Arjun and Vaibhav. Raghavendra appeared as a Dharavi bar owner and the film opened to critical and commercial acclaim in August 2011. For his performance in the film, Raghavendra was recognised as the year's Best Male Debut Actor from the Edison Awards committee.

Raghavendra played his first lead role in the Telugu film, Backbench Student (2013), where he appeared alongside Piaa Bajpai and Archana Kavi. He was cast in the film after the makers were impressed after seeing an interview of the actor during his promotions for Mankatha. He then featured in the fantasy comedy Bunny n Cherry (2013) alongside Prince Cecil. Raghavendra made a return to Tamil films with Jilla (2013), starring alongside Mohanlal and Vijay, in a supporting role. Raghavendra continued to star in small budget ventures including Ladies & Gentlemen (2015) and Run (2016), where he made a guest appearance. Mahat featured in Simbu, Megha Akash Starrer Vantha Rajavathaan Varuven Tamil Movie, which was released in February 2019.

Aatla Arjun Reddy directorial Cycle, a Telugu Movie, was released in January 2021 featuring Mahat and Punarnavi. Currently, he is shooting for his portions in 3 Tamil Movies namely Kettavanu Per Edutha Nallavanda, Ivan Than Uthaman, and Kaadhal Conditions Apply.

A light-hearted, breezy romantic drama is in the making, which will have Mahat and Sana. Kadhal Conditions Apply is directed by debutant Arvind R.

Personal life
Mahat completed his schooling from Zion Matriculation School, Kodaikanal. He went on to graduate from Hindustan College of Arts & Science, Padur. Mahat's father Venkata Suryanarayana is a chemical engineer. His mother Umadevi Garimella is an ex-employee of the prestigious Commonwealth of Nations. She holds a master's degree in Biochemistry. He has an elder sister, Renu.

Mahat began dating model Prachi Mishra, a former runner-up in the Miss Earth 2012 pageant, in 2017. The pair became engaged in April 2019. Raghavendra married Prachi Mishra on 1 February 2020. He announced his wife's pregnancy in February 2020. Their son Adiyaman Raghavendra was born on 7 June 2021.

Filmography

Films

Television 
Bigg Boss 2 - Contestant - Evicted Day 70 (2018)
Unlimit (2018)
Dancing Superstars (2019)
Bigg Boss 3 - Guest (2019)
Bigg Boss 4 - Guest (2020)
Bigg Boss (Hindi season 16) - Guest (2022)

Web series

Awards 
2012: Edison Award for Best Debut Actor – Mankatha

References

External links
 

Male actors from Chennai
Tamil male actors
Living people
Loyola College, Chennai alumni
Male actors in Tamil cinema
Indian male film actors
21st-century Indian male actors
Male actors in Telugu cinema
Bigg Boss (Tamil TV series) contestants
1987 births